Countess of Scarborough was launched at Whitby in 1777. The Royal Navy hired her as a hired armed ship in 1777. She participated in the capture of two privateers before she and  succumbed to a small American flotilla off Flamborough Head in 1779. She briefly became a French privateer. Her subsequent fate is unknown.

Hired armed ship
Countess of Scarborough first appeared in Lloyd's Register (LR)) in 1778 with Hammond, master, Hammond, Sr., owner, and trade Whitby.

The Royal Navy commissioned Countess of Scarborough in November 1777 under the command of Captain Thomas Piercy.

Medea captured Duc de la Vauguyon (or Duc de Lavaugnon) of Dunkirk, a cutter of 14 guns and 98 men, after a fight of an hour. The fight cost the French four men killed and ten wounded; Medea had no casualties. Duc de la Vauguyon had been launched in 1779 and was under the command of Commandante Marin Le Page.

Duc de la Vauguyon had captured and ransomed a lobster smack sailing from Norway to Britain. The master of the smack informed Captain James Montague of Medea that the privateer had had a consort. Medeas rigging was too cut up for her to pursue the consort, so Montague sent Piercy after her. Piercy caught up with Compte de Maurepas after a few hours and the privateer struck without resistance. She was armed with fourteen 4-pounder guns and had a crew of 87 men.

Battle

Bonhomme Richard, and sporadically Alliance, engaged Serapis, ultimately capturing her. Countess of Scarborough sailed to engage Pallas, which was armed with 32 guns. The battle with Pallas lasted some two hours. After Countess of Scarborough had sustained much damage and suffered heavy casualties, Piercy observed another frigate coming up on her larboard quarter; Piercy then surrendered. In the battle, Countess of Scarborough lost four men killed and 20 men wounded, three of whom later died. All her braces, the great part of the running rigging, and her main and mizen top-sail sheets were shot away. Also, enemy fire had dismounted seven of her guns. 

At the onset of the action the merchant vessels separated. Most took shelter near Scarborough. Two went to Hull. By their resistance, Serapis and Countess of Scarborough saved the Baltic fleet from capture.

Aftermath
The court martial on 10 March 1780 for the loss of his ship acquitted Piercy, his officers and men, stating they "have in the execution of such duty done infinite credit to themselves by a very obstinate defence against a superior force." Piercy soon after received a promotion to post-captain. The Court of Directors of the Royal Exchange Assurance Company voted to present him with a piece of plate worth 50 guineas, "as a testimony of their approbation of his bravery and conduct in protecting the valuable fleet from the Baltic under his care." The Scarborough Borough Council on 25 October 1779 presented Piercy with the "Freedom of the  Borough" and a silver casket lined with heart of oak made by James Phipps of London (c. 1779–1783). Piercy died on 1 October 1793 and was interred in the cloisters of Canterbury Cathedral.

Casket
Since his death the casket has accompanied every . In 1972, after the decommissioning of the last , Captain W.J. Graham, her last commander, handed the casket to the Scarborough Borough Council, requesting that the Council retain the casket until such time as there was a new HMS Scarborough; the casket then rested at Scarborough's town hall until the town transferred it to the Hull Maritime Museum where it is currently on display.

French privateer
Her prize crew brought Countess of Scarborough first to Holland, and then to Dunkirk, where she was sold. She became a French privateer, while initially retaining her name. Her ultimate fate is unknown, suggesting that she may have been renamed later.

Notes, citations, and references
Notes

Citations

References

 
 

Hired armed vessels of the Royal Navy
Captured ships
1770s ships
Privateer ships of France